Thirlby is a village and civil parish in Hambleton district of North Yorkshire, England.
Unlike its near neighbours, the village is not mentioned in the Domesday Book.

Governance

The village lies within the Thirsk and Malton UK Parliament constituency. It is also within the Thirsk electoral division of North Yorkshire County Council and the Whitestonecliffe ward of Hambleton District Council.

Geography

According to the 2001 UK Census, the village had a population of 127, of which 103 were over the age of sixteen. Of these, 68 were in employment. The village had 54 dwellings of which 43 were detached.

The nearest settlements are Felixkirk  to the north west; Sutton-under-Whitestonecliffe  to the south south west; Cold Kirby  to the east and Boltby  to the north. Thirlby Beck runs through the east of the village and is part of the tributary system of the River Swale.

Notable residents

Veterinarian and author James Alfred Wight, known popularly as James Herriot, lived in Thirlby, fictionally named as High Field House in Hannerly in his books If Only They Could Talk and It Shouldn't Happen to a Vet.

References

External links

 Village Community Website

Villages in North Yorkshire
Civil parishes in North Yorkshire